Tech 1 Racing is a racing team based in Toulouse, France. They currently compete in the World Series by Renault and Eurocup Mégane Trophy.

Tech 1 also operate the Panis Racing LMP2 entry to the European Le Mans Series and the Ultimate LMP2 Pro-Am entry to the FIA World Endurance Championship.

Career

French Formula Renault 2.0
The team was founded in 2000 by French racing driver Simon Abadie. They joined the French Formula Renault 2.0 championship the same year, with Abadie finishing as runner-up in the standings. They also finished as runner-up in the series in 2003 before leaving the championship at the end of the 2005 season.

Eurocup Mégane Trophy
In 2005, Tech 1 joined the newly formed Eurocup Mégane Trophy, with Matthieu Lahaye and Simon Abadie finishing ninth and tenth respectively in the championship. The following year they finished second in the Drivers' championship with Lahaye and also claimed the Teams' title, the first of three consecutive Teams' championships. In 2007, they claimed a one-two finish in the drivers' championship, with Portuguese driver Pedro Petiz taking the title ahead of team-mate Dimitri Enjalbert.

World Series by Renault
2006 saw Tech 1 Racing join the World Series by Renault championship with drivers Jérôme d'Ambrosio and Ryo Fukuda. Tech 1 took over Saulnier Racing's single-seater racing structure and equipment. After a steady first season the team finished twelfth in the Teams' standings, with Fukuda taking their best race result of fourth place at both Donington Park and Le Mans.

In 2007 the team fielded former British Formula 3 champion Álvaro Parente and Frenchman Julien Jousse. Parente took two victories during the season (at Monaco and Spa-Francorchamps) to claim the title ahead of Ben Hanley, with Jousse finishing in tenth position. Tech 1 also secured the Teams' title, ahead of International DracoRacing and Carlin Motorsport.

Jousse remained with the team for the 2008 season, where he was joined by Formula Renault graduate Charles Pic. After taking six podium places – including a win at Barcelona – Jousse finished second in the championship behind Giedo van der Garde, whilst Pic took wins at Monaco and Le Mans to finish in sixth place. The team also won their second consecutive Teams' title.

Pairing the drivers Daniel Ricciardo and Brendon Hartley at the start of the season (the latter would be replaced by 2010 British Formula 3 season champion Jean-Éric Vergne), Tech 1 secured the 2010 season title.

The team claimed just one more team title in 2012 season, with Jules Bianchi finishing vice-champion in the standings, before withdrawing from the sport three seasons later.

Results

Eurocup Formula Renault 2.0

Formula Renault 2.0 NEC

Formula Renault 3.5 Series

GP3

In detail 
(key) (Races in bold indicate pole position) (Races in italics indicate fastest lap)

Timeline

Notes

References

External links
 Official website
 Renault-Sport Official website

French auto racing teams
World Series Formula V8 3.5 teams
GP3 Series teams
Formula Renault Eurocup teams
Auto racing teams established in 2000
2000 establishments in France
British Formula Renault teams
Blancpain Endurance Series teams
FIA World Endurance Championship teams
24 Hours of Le Mans teams
European Le Mans Series teams